Trochomeriopsis is a genus of flowering plants belonging to the family Cucurbitaceae.

Its native range is Madagascar.

Species:
 Trochomeriopsis diversifolia Cogn.

References

Cucurbitaceae
Cucurbitaceae genera
Taxa named by Alfred Cogniaux